The 1946 Bebington Municipal Borough Council election took place in 1946 to elect members of Bebington Municipal Borough Council in England.

After the election, the composition of the council was:

Election results

Overall election result

Overall result compared with 1945.

Ward results

Eastham

Higher Bebington

Lower Bebington

New Ferry

North Bromborough

Park

Poulton

South Bromborough

Sunlight

Woodhey

Notes

• italics denote a sitting councillor • bold denotes the winning candidate

References

1946 English local elections
1946
1940s in Lancashire